UNFP may refer to:

 Union Nationale des Footballeurs Professionels (English: National Union of Professional Footballers)
 Union Nationale des Forces Populaires (English: National Union of Popular Forces)